Rusty Peden (6 January 1916 – 23 June 1995) was a Canadian cyclist. He competed in the individual and team road race events at the 1936 Summer Olympics.

References

External links
 

1916 births
1995 deaths
Canadian male cyclists
Olympic cyclists of Canada
Cyclists at the 1936 Summer Olympics
Cyclists from British Columbia
Sportspeople from Victoria, British Columbia
20th-century Canadian people